The 2019 BWF season was the overall badminton circuit organized by the Badminton World Federation (BWF) for the 2019 badminton season to publish and promote the sport. The world badminton tournament in 2019 consisted of:
1. BWF Tournaments (Grade 1; Major Events)
 BWF World Mixed Team Championships (Sudirman Cup)
 BWF World Championships

2. BWF World Tour (Grade 2)
 Level 1 (BWF World Tour Finals)
 Level 2 (BWF World Tour Super 1000)
 Level 3 (BWF World Tour Super 750)
 Level 4 (BWF World Tour Super 500)
 Level 5 (BWF World Tour Super 300)
 Level 6 (BWF Tour Super 100)

3. Continental Circuit (Grade 3) BWF Open Tournaments: BWF International Challenge, BWF International Series, and BWF Future Series.

The Sudirman Cup were teams event. The others – Super 1000, Super 750, Super 500, Super 300, Super 100, International Challenge, International Series, and Future Series are all individual tournaments. The higher the level of tournament, the larger the prize money and the more ranking points available.

The 2019 BWF season calendar comprises these six levels of BWF tournaments.

Schedule 
This is the complete schedule of events on the 2019 calendar, with the Champions and Runners-up documented.
Key

January

February

March

April

May

June

July

August

September

October

November

December

BWF Player of the Year Awards 
The followings are the nominees and the winners of the 2019 BWF Player of the Year Awards.

Retirements 
Following is a list of notable players (winners of a main tour title, and/or part of the BWF Rankings top 100 for at least one week) who announced their retirement from professional badminton, during the 2019 season:
  Liliyana Natsir (born 9 September 1985 in Manado, North Sulawesi, Indonesia) reached a career high of no. 1 in the mixed doubles event with two different partners. Having won 51 individual titles, including a gold at the 2016 Rio Summer Olympics, four golds at the World Championships, and a gold at the World Cup. She officially announced her retirement on 27 January 2019. The 2019 Indonesia Masters was her last tournament.
  Debby Susanto (born 3 May 1989 in Palembang, South Sumatra, Indonesia) reached a career high of no. 2 in the mixed doubles event on 2 November 2016. She won a mixed doubles bronze medal at the 2014 Incheon Asian Games, in addition to 7 individual titles. She announced her retirement at the 2019 Djarum Superliga Badminton tournament on 24 February 2019. The 2019 Indonesia Masters was her last tournament.
  Kamilla Rytter Juhl (born 23 November 1983 in Skagen, Denmark) reached a career high of no. 1 in the mixed doubles and no.2 in the women's doubles event. She won silver medal at the 2016 Rio Olympics; a gold, a silver, and two bronze medals at the World Championships; seven gold, a silver, and two bronze medals at the European Championships; also 24 titles in BWF sanctioned tournaments, with the prestigious 2018 All England Open as her last title. She announced her retirement in July 2018, due to her being pregnant, and officially announced her retirement from the BWF World Tour on 11 March 2019.
  Christinna Pedersen (born 12 May 1986 in Aalborg, Denmark) reached a career high of no. 1 in the mixed doubles and no.2 in the women's doubles event. She won a silver and a bronze medal at the Olympic Games; a silver, and four bronze medals at the World Championships; six gold, and two silver medals at the European Championships; also 36 titles in BWF sanctioned tournaments, with the prestigious 2018 All England Open as her last title. She  officially announced her retirement from the BWF World Tour on 11 March 2019. The 2019 Swiss Open was her last tournament.
  Tang Jinhua (born 8 January 1992 in Nanjing, Jiangsu, China) reached a career high of no. 1 in the women's doubles on 29 May 2014. She was part of the national team that won the 2009 and 2010 World Junior Championships, 2010 Asian Junior Championships, 2013 Sudirman Cup, also in 2014 and 2016 Uber Cup. In the individual events, she was two times girls' doubles gold medalists at the Asian Junior Championships and once in World Junior. Tang had captured 23 senior titles in the women's and mixed doubles events. She announced her retirement on her Weibo account on 16 May 2019. The 2018 Korea Open was her last tournament.
  Lee Chong Wei (born 21 October 1982 in Bagan Serai, Perak, Malaysia) reached a career high of no. 1 in the men's singles on 29 June 2006, spent a whopping 349 weeks, including a 199-week streak from 2008 to 2012. He won three silver medals at the Summer Olympics in 2008 Beijing, 2012 London, and 2016 Rio. He had bagged 69 titles throughout his career, including 46 titles in high level BWF Superseries event. He diagnosed with early-stage nose cancer in July 2018, and after treatment in Taiwan, he announced that he had no intention to retire. Lee finally was unable to compete in high-level tournament after failing several times tests from his doctor, and announced his retirement on 13 June 2019. The 2018 Indonesia Open was his last tournament.
  Jacco Arends (born 28 January 1991 in Haarlem, the Netherlands) reached a career high of no. 12 in the mixed doubles on 26 November 2015. He was a bronze medalist at the 2016 European Championships, having won 13 individual titles, including a Grand Prix title. He announced his retirement from the professional badminton through his Instagram account on 17 July 2019. The 2019 U.S. Open was his last tournament.
  Rajiv Ouseph (born 30 August 1986 in Hounslow, London, England) reached a career high of no. 10 in the men's singles on 27 October 2016. He was a gold medalist at the 2017 European Championships, had collected five Commonwealth Games medals, won eleven BWF events including 2010 U.S. Open, and in 2016 Rio Olympics, he became the first Great Britain men's singles player to reach the Olympic quarterfinals. He announced his retirement on 17 July 2019, and after went down in the first of the 2019 BWF World Championships on 19 August, became his last career as a professional badminton player. Ouseph hopes to return to badminton in a coaching or advisory capacity.
  Yu Xiaohan (born 29 September 1994 in Huaibei, Anhui, China) reached a career high of no. 9 in the women's doubles on 3 May 2018. She was part of the national team that won the 2011 Asian and 2012 World Junior Championships. She captured 12 individual events titles, including 2015 Singapore and 2017 Korea Opens. She announced her retirement through her personal social media Weibo on 13 October 2019, where before, she had given a resignation letter to the coach on 30 September 2019. The 2019 Belarus International was her last title and tournament.
  Li Xuerui (born 24 January 1991 in Chongqing, China) reached a career high of no. 1 in the women's singles on 20 December 2012. Having won 27 individual titles, including a gold at the 2012 London Summer Olympics. She helped the national team win the Uber Cup in 2012, 2014 and 2016; the Sudirman Cup in 2013 and 2015; and at the Asian Games in 2014. She was awarded the BWF Female Player of the Year in 2013. BWF website announced her retirement from the international tournaments on 17 October 2019. The 2019 Korea Open was her last tournament.
  Lu Kai (born 4 October 1991 in Nanning, Guangxi, China) reached a career high of no. 2 in the mixed doubles on 2 February 2018. He won the gold medals at the 2009 Asian Junior Championships and 2017 Asian Championships. At the BWF Tour (Superseries and Grand Prix events), he captured 11 titles, including the 2017 All England Open. He announced his retirement through his personal Weibo account on 21 November 2019, ending his 11-year career with the national team, therefore also no longer be playing at international tournaments. The 2019 Hong Kong Open was his last tournament.
  Lee Hyun-il (born 17 April 1980 in Seoul, South Korea) reached a career high of no. 1 in the men's singles on 21 February 2004. Lee previously announced his retirement from international badminton and only competed in national competitions after the 2008 Beijing Olympics. However, he made a came back in April 2010. He competed in three consecutive Olympic Games in 2004, 2008 and 2012. He was a bronze medalist in 2006 World Championships, and was part of the national team that won the 2002, 2014 Asian Games and 2003 Sudirman Cup. At the BWF tour, he has collected 25 titles. Lee who joined the Miryang City team in 2018, announced his retirement on 22 November 2019. He won his last international title in 2018 Macau Open, and the 2019 Italian International became his last tournament.
  Minatsu Mitani (born 4 September 1991 in Ishikawa Prefecture, Japan) reached a career high of world no. 9 in the women's singles. She competed at the 2014 Asian Games, won a bronze medal in 2014 BWF World Championships and collected six international individual titles. She expressed his desire to retire after lost in the second round of 73rd All Japan Comprehensive Championships on 28 November, and officially announced her retirement at the first day of 2019 S/J League on 20 December. The 2019 Akita Masters was her last international tournament.
  Ayane Kurihara (born 27 September 1989 in Kitakyushu, Fukuoka, Japan) reached a career high of world no. 11 in the mixed doubles. She spent 22 years in badminton career, and entered the national team at the age of nineteen. Kurihara competed at the 2016 Summer Olympics, and collected seven international individual titles. She announced her retirement through her Twitter account on 23 December 2019. The 2019 Korea Masters was her last tournament.

References

External links
 Badminton World Federation (BWF) at www.bwfbadminton.org

2019 in badminton
Badminton World Federation seasons